Patalkot may refer to:

Patalkot, Madhya Pradesh, India
Patalkot, Nepal